Desperate Measures is the second album by the New York City Hardcore/ thrash metal band Leeway. It was released in June 1991 on Rock Hotel/Profile Records as was its predecessor, Born to Expire in 1989. It was followed by 1994's Adult Crash.

It features two line-up changes from the previous album: Jimmy Xanthos and Pokey replace Zowie and Tony Fontão on bass and drums respectively.

Overview
While the previous album showed a clear hardcore influence, the sound on Desperate Measures is of thrash metal akin to Anthrax or Testament. However, like its predecessor, it had fans in both metal and hardcore camps.

Guitarist and songwriter, A.J. Novello, had this to say on the album:
...it wasn't exactly what I had in mind. (It) was a little too metallic. Eddie's vocals were drenched in effects (Suttons' critical comparison to Ozzy began here), the songs were more left-field, and we initially disappointed some fans.

In contrast to Novello, guitarist Michael Gibbons perceives the album in a more positive manner:
I still love Desperate Measures. Eddie's vocals were mixed too heavily, I agree. But, as a metalhead from Queens first, before I was even a hardcore fan, I've always loved that recording. A lot of hardcore fans also loved it, as well as some prominent people from the NYHC scene who have admitted that to me through the years.

Unlike the previous album, Desperate Measures shows more  rhythm & groove yet a melodic oriented sound with more variety, such as songs like "Kingpin" incorporate elements of a rap metal/rapcore sound, while another track like "2 Minute Warning" had more of a hip hop/rap & funk influence.

Track listing
"Make Me An Offer" (Eddie Sutton, A.J. Novello, Michael Gibbons) –	5:49
"All About Dope" (Sutton, Novello, H Ackerman)	–	4:27
"Soft Way Out"	(Sutton, Novello) –	3:29
"Stand For" (Sutton, Novello)	–	3:41
"No Heroes" (Sutton, Novello)	–	3:46
"Kingpin" (Sutton, Novello, Gibbons)	–	3:53
"Who's to Blame" (Sutton, Gibbons)	–	4:06
"Ball Hugger" (Sutton, Gibbons)	–	3:23
"2 Minute Warning" (Sutton)	–	2:01
"The Future (Ain't What it Used to Be)" (Sutton, Novello, Gibbons) – 7:27

Personnel 
 Eddie Sutton – vocals
 A.J. Novello – guitar
 Michael Gibbons – guitar
 Jimmy Xanthos – bass
 Pokey – drums
 Recorded in April, 1990 at Normandy Sound, Warren, Rhode Island, USA
 Produced by Chris Williamson
 Mastered by Howie Weinberg at Masterdisk, New York City, USA
 Re-issue re-mastered by Alan Douches at West Westside Music

Notes

External links
Leeway official website
BNR Metal discography page

1991 albums
Leeway (band) albums